Cabrières is the name or part of the name of several communes in France:

 Cabrières, Gard, in the Gard department
 Cabrières, Hérault, in the Hérault department
 Cabrières-d'Aigues, in the Vaucluse department
 Cabrières-d'Avignon, in the Vaucluse department